Panikos Rimis (born 4 December 1938) is a Cypriot sailor. He competed in the Finn event at the 1980 Summer Olympics.

References

External links
 

1938 births
Living people
Cypriot male sailors (sport)
Olympic sailors of Cyprus
Sailors at the 1980 Summer Olympics – Finn
Place of birth missing (living people)